The 2012 Women's Football Alliance season was the fourth season of the Women's Football Alliance, a league of 64 teams.  The regular season began on Saturday, April 2, and ended on Saturday, June 18.  After the playoffs, which fielded 12 teams in each conference instead of the 8 that were fielded in the 2011 season, the season ended with the WFA Championship Game on Saturday, August 4 at Heinz Field in Pittsburgh, Pennsylvania, home of the Pittsburgh Steelers (it was the first women's football championship game to be played at a National Football League stadium). The game was shown live on ESPN3, the first time a live women's football game has been shown on a major network. In the championship, the San Diego Surge defeated the Chicago Force 40–36, winning its first championship, having lost the previous year to the Boston Militia.

Regular-season standings

National Conference

American Conference

References

External links 
 Women's Football Alliance

Women's Football Alliance Season, 2012
Women's Football Alliance